In mathematics, a canonical basis is a basis of an algebraic structure that is canonical in a sense that depends on the precise context:

 In a coordinate space, and more generally in a free module, it refers to the standard basis defined by the Kronecker delta.
 In a polynomial ring, it refers to its standard basis given by the monomials, .
 For finite extension fields, it means the polynomial basis.
 In linear algebra, it refers to a set of n linearly independent generalized eigenvectors of an n×n matrix , if the set is composed entirely of Jordan chains.
 In representation theory, it refers to the basis of the quantum groups introduced by Lusztig.

Representation theory
The canonical basis for the irreducible representations of a quantized enveloping algebra of
type  and also for the plus part of that algebra was introduced by Lusztig  by
two methods: an algebraic one (using a braid group action and PBW bases) and a topological one
(using intersection cohomology). Specializing the parameter  to  yields a canonical basis for the irreducible representations of the corresponding simple Lie algebra, which was
not known earlier. Specializing the parameter  to  yields something like a shadow of a basis. This shadow (but not the basis itself) for the case of irreducible representations
was considered independently by Kashiwara; it is sometimes called the crystal basis.
The definition of the canonical basis was extended to the Kac-Moody setting by Kashiwara  (by an algebraic method) and by Lusztig  (by a topological method).

There is a general concept underlying these bases:

A precanonical structure on a free -module  consists of

A canonical basis of the precanonical structure is then a -basis  of  that satisfies:
  and
 
for all . 

One can show that there exists at most one canonical basis for each precanonical structure.

 Hecke algebras 
Let  be a Coxeter group.

 

with  being the Kazhdan–Lusztig polynomials.

Linear algebra
A matrix in Jordan normal form is an "almost diagonal matrix," that is, as close to diagonal as possible. A diagonal matrix  is a special case of a matrix in Jordan normal form. An ordinary eigenvector is a special case of a generalized eigenvector.

Every n × n matrix  possesses n linearly independent generalized eigenvectors. Generalized eigenvectors corresponding to distinct eigenvalues are linearly independent.

For any given n × n matrix , there are infinitely many ways to pick the n linearly independent generalized eigenvectors.  If they are chosen in a particularly judicious manner, we can use these vectors to show that  is similar to a matrix in Jordan normal form.  In particular,

Definition:  A set of n linearly independent generalized eigenvectors is a canonical basis if it is composed entirely of Jordan chains.

Computation
First, find the ranks (matrix ranks) of the matrices .

Now define

Note that

Once we have determined the number of generalized eigenvectors of each rank that a canonical basis has, we can obtain the vectors explicitly (see generalized eigenvector).

Example
This example illustrates a canonical basis with two Jordan chains.  Unfortunately, it is a little difficult to construct an interesting example of low order.
The matrix

For  we have 

 has rank 5,
 has rank 4,
 has rank 3,
 has rank 2.

Therefore 

Thus, a canonical basis for  will have, corresponding to  one generalized eigenvector each of ranks 4, 3, 2 and 1.

For  we have 

 has rank 5,
 has rank 4.

Therefore 

Thus, a canonical basis for  will have, corresponding to  one generalized eigenvector each of ranks 2 and 1.

See also
 Canonical form
 Change of basis
 Normal basis
 Normal form (disambiguation)
 Polynomial basis

Notes

References
 
 

 

Linear algebra
Abstract algebra
Lie algebras
Representation theory
Quantum groups